Cole Walsh (born June 14, 1995) is an American athlete specializing in the pole vault.

Biography
Cole Wash started his vaulting career at Brophy College Preparatory in Phoenix, Arizona. He continued on to University of Oregon where he was selected for the 2014 World Junior Championships in Athletics. He finished third at 2018 USA Outdoor Track and Field Championships, with his personal best of 5.75 m. He finished second at 2019 USA Outdoor Track and Field Championships with another jump of 5.76 m. His personal best (indoor) is 5.83 m, in Zürich, Switzerland. In 2020, he was given a three-month ban for breaking anti-doping regulations after testing positive for cannabis.

References

External links
 
 

American male pole vaulters
1995 births
Living people
Doping cases in athletics
Oregon Ducks men's track and field athletes